"Forever Mine" is a song by American new wave band The Motels, which was released in 1982 as the third single from their third studio album All Four One. The song was written by Martha Davis and produced by Val Garay. "Forever Mine" peaked at number 60 on the US Billboard Hot 100.

Background
In a 1982 interview with The Boston Globe, Davis described "Forever Mine" as "the first happy song of my career", adding that at that point in her life she was "so in love and so happy".

Critical reception
On its release, Cash Box commented that "Forever Mine" "showcases the urgent power in Martha Davis' voice that gives The Motels its distinctive sound". They added that the song is "suitable for a wide range of formats" and "should continue the group's upward climb".

Track listing
7–inch single
"Forever Mine" – 3:22
"So L.A." – 3:36

7–inch promotional single (US)
"Forever Mine" – 3:22
"Forever Mine" – 3:22

Personnel
Credits are adapted from the All Four One LP inner sleeve notes and 7-inch single sleeve notes.

The Motels
 Martha Davis – vocals
 Marty Jourard – keyboards
 Michael Goodroe – bass
 Brian Glascock – drums
 Guy Perry – guitar

Production
 Val Garay – producer

Charts

References

1982 songs
1982 singles
The Motels songs
Capitol Records singles
Songs written by Martha Davis (musician)
Song recordings produced by Val Garay